Outlaw is a 1999 Italian drama film directed by Enzo Monteleone. It is based on the book by the Italian anarchist Horst Fantazzini. It was entered into the 21st Moscow International Film Festival.

Plot
On July 23, 1973, in the prison of Fossano, Piedmont, the young Horst Fantazzini, detained with a sentence of 22 years, decides that the time has come to try to escape. However, the operation soon turns out to be more difficult than expected, and Horst is forced to take two guards hostage. At this point the jailbreak can be said to have failed in practice, but Horst certainly has no intention of giving up. Thus begins a long day, punctuated by the slow passing of minutes and hours, along which negotiations, hopes, hostage fears, Fantazzini's wife's anxiety, the telephone calls of the lawyer who uselessly advises Horst to surrender, a phone call from his father, who reproaches his son for being a thief without a real motivation unlike when he had specific political and social goals.

Cast
 Stefano Accorsi as Horst Fantazzini
 Giovanni Esposito as guard Di Gennaro
 Emilio Solfrizzi as guard Loiacono
 Antonio Catania as prosecutor D'Onofrio
 Antonio Petrocelli as prison warden Ridolfi
Fabrizia Sacchi as Anna, wife of Fantazzini
Paolo Graziosi as carabinieri colonel Tagliaferri 
Alessandro Haber as Fantazzini's lawyer
Francesco Guccini as Alfonso Fantazzini, father of Horst

References

External links
 

Italian drama films
1999 films
1999 drama films
Films about anarchism
1990s Italian-language films
Films directed by Enzo Monteleone
Films set in 1973
1990s Italian films